Malbašić is a surname. Notable people with the surname include:

Filip Malbašić (born 1992), Serbian footballer
Stojan Malbašić (born 1959), Bosnia and Herzegovina footballer

Serbian surnames